Iris hypoplasia with glaucoma, also known as Iris hypoplasia and glaucoma or simply IHG is a very rare genetic disorder which is characterized by a combination of an underdeveloped of the iris and glaucoma. It has been described in three families; two from Russia and one from London, U.K. It was mapped to a duplication of the q25 region of chromosome 6 through the London family. Tooth agenesis can sometimes be associated with this disorder.

References 
 

Rare diseases
Genetic diseases and disorders
Rare genetic syndromes
Congenital disorders of eyes